Aloa is a genus of tiger moths in the family Erebidae.

Species
 Aloa cardinalis (Butler, 1875)
 Aloa ihlei Černý, 2009
 Aloa lactinea (Cramer, 1777)

Aloa sensu lato 
 Aloa albistriga Walker, 1865
 Aloa collaris Hampson, 1891
 Aloa costalis Walker, 1865
 Aloa flavimargo (Hampson, 1894)
 Aloa gangara Swinhoe, 1892
 Aloa moloneyi Druce, 1887

Species transferred into Micraloa 
 Aloa emittens (Walker, 1855)
 Aloa lineola Fabricius, 1793

Species transferred into Paramsacta 
 Aloa marginata (Donovan, 1805)
 Aloa moorei (Butler, 1875)

Other uses 

 Aloa, Queensland, a town in the Northern Peninsula Area Region, Australia

References
Natural History Museum Lepidoptera generic names catalog

Spilosomina
Moth genera